The Commonwealth of Nations, simply referred to as the Commonwealth, is a political association of 56 member states, the vast majority of which are former territories of the British Empire. The chief institutions of the organisation are the Commonwealth Secretariat, which focuses on intergovernmental aspects, and the Commonwealth Foundation, which focuses on non-governmental relations among member states. Numerous organisations are associated with and operate within the Commonwealth.

The Commonwealth dates back to the first half of the 20th century with the decolonisation of the British Empire through increased self-governance of its territories. It was originally created as the British Commonwealth of Nations through the Balfour Declaration at the 1926 Imperial Conference, and formalised by the United Kingdom through the Statute of Westminster in 1931. The current Commonwealth of Nations was formally constituted by the London Declaration in 1949, which modernised the community and established the member states as "free and equal".

The head of the Commonwealth is Charles III.  He is king of 15 member states, known as the Commonwealth realms, while 36 other members are republics, and five others have different monarchs.

Member states have no legal obligations to one another but are connected through their use of the English language and historical ties. The Commonwealth Charter defines their shared values of democracy, human rights, and the rule of law, as promoted by the quadrennial Commonwealth Games.

History

Origins of the concept and establishment of the term

Queen Elizabeth II, in her address to Canada on Dominion Day in 1959, pointed out that the Confederation of Canada on 1 July 1867 had been the birth of the "first independent country within the British Empire". She declared: "So, it also marks the beginning of that free association of independent states which is now known as the Commonwealth of Nations." As long ago as 1884 Lord Rosebery, while visiting Australia, had described the changing British Empire, as some of its colonies became more independent, as a "Commonwealth of Nations". Conferences of British and colonial prime ministers occurred periodically from the first one in 1887, leading to the creation of the Imperial Conferences in 1911.

The Commonwealth developed from the imperial conferences. A specific proposal was presented by Jan Smuts in 1917 when he coined the term "the British Commonwealth of Nations" and envisioned the "future constitutional relations and readjustments in essence" at the Paris Peace Conference of 1919, attended by delegates from the Dominions as well as the United Kingdom. The term first received imperial statutory recognition in the Anglo-Irish Treaty of 1921, when the term British Commonwealth of Nations was substituted for British Empire in the wording of the oath taken by members of parliament of the Irish Free State.

Adoption and formalisation of the Commonwealth
In the Balfour Declaration at the 1926 Imperial Conference, the United Kingdom and its dominions agreed they were "equal in status, in no way subordinate one to another in any aspect of their domestic or external affairs, though united by common allegiance to the Crown, and freely associated as members of the British Commonwealth of Nations". The term "Commonwealth" was officially adopted to describe the community.

These aspects to the relationship were formalised by the Statute of Westminster in 1931, which applied to Canada without the need for ratification, but Australia, New Zealand, and Newfoundland had to ratify the statute for it to take effect. Newfoundland never did as due to economic hardship and the need for financial assistance from London, Newfoundland voluntarily accepted the suspension of self-government in 1934 and governance reverted to direct control from London. Newfoundland later joined Canada as its tenth province in 1949. Australia and New Zealand ratified the Statute in 1942 and 1947 respectively.

Although the Union of South Africa was not among the Dominions that needed to adopt the Statute of Westminster for it to take effect, two laws—the Status of the Union Act, 1934, and the Royal Executive Functions and Seals Act of 1934—were passed to confirm South Africa's status as a sovereign state.

Decolonisation and self-governance

After the Second World War ended, the British Empire was gradually dismantled.  Most of its components have become independent countries, whether Commonwealth realms or republics, and members of the Commonwealth. There remain the 14 mainly self-governing British overseas territories which retain some political association with the United Kingdom. In April 1949, following the London Declaration, the word "British" was dropped from the title of the Commonwealth to reflect its changing nature.

Burma (Myanmar since 1989) and Aden (now part of the Republic of Yemen) are the only states that were British colonies at the time of the war not to have joined the Commonwealth upon independence. Former British protectorates and mandates that did not become members of the Commonwealth are Egypt (independent in 1922), Iraq (1932), Transjordan (1946), Palestine (part of which became the state of Israel in 1948), Sudan (1956), British Somaliland (which united with the former Italian Somaliland in 1960 to form the Somali Republic), Kuwait (1961), Bahrain (1971), Oman (1971), Qatar (1971), and the United Arab Emirates (1971).

The postwar Commonwealth was given a fresh mission by Queen Elizabeth II in her Christmas Day 1953 broadcast, in which she envisioned the Commonwealth as "an entirely new conception – built on the highest qualities of the Spirit of Man: friendship, loyalty, and the desire for freedom and peace". Hoped-for success was reinforced by such achievements as climbing Mount Everest in 1953, breaking the four-minute mile in 1954, and a solo circumnavigation of the globe in 1966.

After the Second World War, the British treasury was so weak that it could not operate independently of the United States. The loss of defence and financial roles, furthermore, undermined Joseph Chamberlain's early 20th-century vision of a world empire that could combine Imperial preference, mutual defence, and social growth. In addition, the United Kingdom's cosmopolitan role in world affairs became increasingly limited, especially with the losses of India and Singapore. While British politicians at first hoped that the Commonwealth would preserve and project British influence, they gradually lost their enthusiasm, argues Krishnan Srinivasan. Early enthusiasm waned as British policies came under fire at Commonwealth meetings. Public opinion became troubled as immigration from non-white member states became large-scale.

Republics
On 18 April 1949, Ireland formally became a republic in accordance with the Irish Republic of Ireland Act 1948; in doing so, it also formally left the Commonwealth. While Ireland had not actively participated in the Commonwealth since the early 1930s, other dominions wished to become republics without losing Commonwealth ties. The issue came to a head in April 1949 at a Commonwealth prime ministers' meeting in London. Under the London Declaration, India agreed that, when it became a republic in January 1950, it would remain in the Commonwealth and accept the British Sovereign as a "symbol of the free association of its independent member nations and as such the Head of the Commonwealth". Upon hearing this, King George VI told the Indian politician Krishna Menon: "So, I've become 'as such'". Some other Commonwealth countries that have since become republics have chosen to leave, while others, such as Guyana, Mauritius and Dominica, have remained members.

The London Declaration is often seen as marking the beginning of the modern Commonwealth. Following India's precedent, other nations became republics, or constitutional monarchies with their own monarchs. While some countries retained the same monarch as the United Kingdom, their monarchies developed differently and soon became essentially independent of the British monarchy. The monarch is regarded as a separate legal personality in each realm, even though the same person is monarch of each realm.

New Commonwealth
Planners in the interwar period, like Lord Davies, who had also taken "a prominent part in building up the League of Nations Union" in the United Kingdom, in 1932 founded the New Commonwealth Society, of whose British section Winston Churchill became the president. This new society was aimed at the creation of an international air force to be an arm of the League of Nations, to allow nations to disarm and safeguard the peace.

The term 'New Commonwealth' gained usage in the UK (especially in the 1960s and 1970s) to refer to recently decolonised countries, predominantly non-white and developing. It was often used in debates about immigration from these countries. The United Kingdom and the pre-1945 dominions became informally known as the 'Old Commonwealth', or more pointedly as the 'white Commonwealth', in reference to what had been known as the 'White Dominions'.

Plan G and inviting Europe to join
At a time when Germany and France, together with Belgium, Italy, Luxembourg, and the Netherlands, were planning what later became the European Union, and newly independent African countries were joining the Commonwealth, new ideas were floated to prevent the United Kingdom from becoming isolated in economic affairs. British trade with the Commonwealth was four times larger than its trade with Europe. In 1956 and 1957 the British government under Prime Minister Anthony Eden considered a "Plan G" to create a European free trade zone while also protecting the favoured status of the Commonwealth. The United Kingdom also considered inviting Scandinavian and other European countries to join the Commonwealth, so that it would become a major economic common market.

At the time of the Suez Crisis in 1956, in the face of colonial unrest and international tensions, French prime minister Guy Mollet proposed to British prime minister Anthony Eden that their two countries be joined in a "union". When that proposal was turned down, Mollet suggested that France join the Commonwealth, possibly with "a common citizenship arrangement on the Irish basis". These ideas faded away with the end of the Suez Crisis.

Structure

Head of the Commonwealth

Under the formula of the London Declaration, Charles III is the head of the Commonwealth. When the monarch dies, the successor to the crown does not automatically become the new head of the Commonwealth. However, at their meeting in April 2018, Commonwealth leaders agreed that Prince Charles should succeed his mother Elizabeth II as head after her death. The position is symbolic, representing the free association of independent members, the majority of which (36) are republics, and five have monarchs of different royal houses (Brunei, Eswatini, Lesotho, Malaysia, and Tonga).

Commonwealth Heads of Government Meeting

The main decision-making forum of the organisation is the biennial Commonwealth Heads of Government Meeting (CHOGM), where Commonwealth heads of government, including (amongst others) prime ministers and presidents, assemble for several days to discuss matters of mutual interest. CHOGM is the successor to the Meetings of Commonwealth Prime Ministers and, earlier, the Imperial Conferences and Colonial Conferences, dating back to 1887. There are also regular meetings of finance ministers, law ministers, health ministers, etc. Members in arrears, as special members before them, are not invited to send representatives to either ministerial meetings or CHOGMs.

The head of government hosting the CHOGM is called the chair-in-office (CIO) and retains the position until the following CHOGM. Since the most recent CHOGM, in Rwanda in 2022, the chair-in-office has been the president of Rwanda.

The 26th CHOGM was initially to be held in Kigali, Rwanda, in June 2020. Owing to the COVID-19 pandemic, it was rescheduled to be held there in the week of 21 June 2021 before again being postponed to 25-26 June 2022. It was accompanied by meetings of a Commonwealth Youth Forum, a Commonwealth Women's Forum and a Commonwealth People's Forum.

Commonwealth Secretariat

The Commonwealth Secretariat, established in 1965, is the main intergovernmental agency of the Commonwealth, facilitating consultation and co-operation among member governments and countries. It is responsible to member governments collectively. The Commonwealth of Nations is represented in the United Nations General Assembly by the secretariat as an observer. The secretariat organises Commonwealth summits, meetings of ministers, consultative meetings and technical discussions; it assists policy development and provides policy advice, and facilitates multilateral communication among the member governments. It also provides technical assistance to help governments in the social and economic development of their countries and in support of the Commonwealth's fundamental political values.

The secretariat is headed by the Commonwealth secretary-general, who is elected by the Commonwealth heads of government for no more than two four-year terms. The secretary-general and two deputy secretaries-general direct the divisions of the Secretariat. The present secretary-general is Patricia Scotland, Baroness Scotland of Asthal, from Dominica, who took office on 1 April 2016, succeeding Kamalesh Sharma of India (2008–2016). The first secretary-general was Arnold Smith of Canada (1965–75), followed by Sir Shridath Ramphal of Guyana (1975–90), Chief Emeka Anyaoku of Nigeria (1990–99), and Don McKinnon of New Zealand (2000–2008).

Commonwealth citizenship and high commissioners 

Initially, Commonwealth countries were not considered to be "foreign" to each other as their citizens were British subjects. Citizenship laws have evolved independently in each Commonwealth country. For example, in Australia, for the purpose of considering certain constitutional and legal provisions no distinction is made between Commonwealth and foreign countries: in the High Court case of Sue v Hill, other Commonwealth countries (specifically, the United Kingdom) were held to be 'foreign powers'; similarly, in Nolan v Minister for Immigration and Ethnic Affairs, the nationals of other Commonwealth realms were held to be 'aliens'.

Nevertheless, some members treat resident citizens of other Commonwealth countries preferentially to citizens of non-Commonwealth countries (see Commonwealth citizen). The United Kingdom and several others, mostly in the Caribbean, grant the right to vote to Commonwealth citizens who reside in those countries.

The closer association amongst Commonwealth countries is reflected in the diplomatic protocols of the Commonwealth countries. For example, when engaging bilaterally with one another, Commonwealth governments exchange high commissioners instead of ambassadors. In non-Commonwealth countries in which their own country is not represented, Commonwealth citizens may seek consular assistance at the British embassy although it is for the embassy to decide, in its discretion, whether to provide any. Other alternatives can also occur such as the consular services agreement between Canada and Australia that began in 1986.

Membership

Criteria

The criteria for membership of the Commonwealth of Nations have developed over time from a series of separate documents. The Statute of Westminster 1931, as a fundamental founding document of the organisation, laid out that membership required dominionhood. The 1949 London Declaration ended this, allowing republican and indigenous monarchic members on the condition that they recognised King George VI as "Head of the Commonwealth". In the wake of the wave of decolonisation in the 1960s, these constitutional principles were augmented by political, economic, and social principles. The first of these was set out in 1961, when it was decided that respect for racial equality would be a requirement for membership, leading directly to the withdrawal of South Africa's re-application (which they were required to make under the formula of the London Declaration upon becoming a republic). The 14 points of the 1971 Singapore Declaration dedicated all members to the principles of world peace, liberty, human rights, equality, and free trade.

These criteria were unenforceable for two decades, until, in 1991, the Harare Declaration was issued, dedicating the leaders to applying the Singapore principles to the completion of decolonisation, the end of the Cold War, and the end of apartheid in South Africa. The mechanisms by which these principles would be applied were created, and the manner clarified, by the 1995 Millbrook Commonwealth Action Programme, which created the Commonwealth Ministerial Action Group (CMAG), which has the power to rule on whether members meet the requirements for membership under the Harare Declaration. Also in 1995, an Inter-Governmental Group was created to finalise and codify the full requirements for membership. Upon reporting in 1997, as adopted under the Edinburgh Declaration, the Inter-Governmental Group ruled that any future members would have to have a direct constitutional link with an existing member.

In addition to this new rule, the former rules were consolidated into a single document. These requirements are that members must accept and comply with the Harare principles, be fully sovereign states, recognise King Charles III as head of the Commonwealth, accept the English language as the means of Commonwealth communication, and respect the wishes of the general population with regard to Commonwealth membership. These requirements had undergone review, and a report on potential amendments was presented by the Committee on Commonwealth Membership at the 2007 Commonwealth Heads of Government Meeting. New members were not admitted at this meeting, though applications for admission were considered at the 2009 CHOGM.

New members must "as a general rule" have a direct constitutional link to an existing member. In most cases, this is due to being a former colony of the United Kingdom, but some have links to other countries, either exclusively or more directly (e.g., Samoa to New Zealand, Papua New Guinea to Australia, Namibia to South Africa, Bangladesh to Pakistan and Singapore to Malaysia). The first member to be admitted without having any constitutional link to the British Empire or a Commonwealth member was Mozambique in 1995 following its first democratic elections and South Africa's re-admission in 1994. Mozambique was a former Portuguese colony. Mozambique's controversial entry led to the Edinburgh Declaration and the current membership guidelines.

In 2009, Rwanda became the second Commonwealth member admitted not to have any constitutional links to Britain. It was a Belgian trust territory that had been a district of German East Africa until World War I. Consideration for Rwanda's admission was considered an "exceptional circumstance" by the Commonwealth Secretariat. Rwanda was permitted to join despite the Commonwealth Human Rights Initiative (CHRI) finding that "the state of governance and human rights in Rwanda does not satisfy Commonwealth standards", and that it "does not therefore qualify for admission". CHRI commented that: "It does not make sense to admit a state that already does not satisfy Commonwealth standards. This would tarnish the reputation of the Commonwealth and confirm the opinion of many people and civic organisations that the leaders of its governments do not really care for democracy and human rights, and that its periodic, solemn declarations are merely hot air."

In 2022, Togo and Gabon joined the Commonwealth, despite never having been under British rule. Togo being a former German colony (later annexed by France) and Gabon a former French colony.

Members 

The Commonwealth comprises 56 countries, across all inhabited continents. The members have a combined population of 2.4 billion people, almost a third of the world population, with 1.4 billion living in India, and 94% living in either Asia or Africa. After India, the next-largest Commonwealth countries by population are Pakistan (227 million), Nigeria (213 million), Bangladesh (167 million), and the United Kingdom (68 million). Tuvalu is the smallest member, with about 12,000 people.

The status of "Member in Arrears" is used to denote those that are in arrears in paying subscription dues. The status was originally known as "special membership", but was renamed on the Committee on Commonwealth Membership's recommendation. There are currently no Members in Arrears. The most recent Member in Arrears, Nauru, returned to full membership in June 2011. Nauru has alternated between special and full membership since joining the Commonwealth, depending on its financial situation.

Economy of member countries

In 2019, the Commonwealth members had a combined gross domestic product of over $9 trillion, 78% of which is accounted for by the four largest economies: United Kingdom ($3.124 trillion), India ($3.050 trillion), Canada ($1.652 trillion), and Australia ($1.379 trillion).

Applicants

In 1997 the Commonwealth Heads of Government agreed that, to become a member of the Commonwealth, an applicant country should, as a rule, have had a constitutional association with an existing Commonwealth member; that it should comply with Commonwealth values, principles and priorities as set out in the Harare Declaration; and that it should accept Commonwealth norms and conventions.

South Sudanese politicians have expressed interest in joining the Commonwealth. A senior Commonwealth source stated in 2006 that "many people have assumed an interest from Israel, but there has been no formal approach". The State of Palestine is also a potential candidate for membership.

President Yahya Jammeh unilaterally withdrew the Gambia from the Commonwealth in October 2013. However, newly elected president Adama Barrow returned the country to the organisation in February 2018.

Other eligible applicants could be any of the remaining inhabited British Overseas Territories, Crown Dependencies, Australian external territories and the Associated States of New Zealand if they become fully independent. Many such jurisdictions are already directly represented within the Commonwealth, particularly through the Commonwealth Family. There are also former British possessions that have not become independent. Although Hong Kong has become part of China, it continues to participate in some of the institutions within the Commonwealth Family, including the Commonwealth Lawyers Association, the Commonwealth Parliamentary Association, the Association of Commonwealth Universities, the Commonwealth Association of Legislative Counsel and the Commonwealth War Graves Commission (CWGC).

All three of the Crown dependencies regard their existing situation as unsatisfactory and have lobbied for change. The States of Jersey have called on the UK foreign secretary to request that the Commonwealth heads of government "consider granting associate membership to Jersey and the other Crown Dependencies as well as any other territories at a similarly advanced stage of autonomy". Jersey has proposed that it be accorded "self-representation in all Commonwealth meetings; full participation in debates and procedures, with a right to speak where relevant and the opportunity to enter into discussions with those who are full members; and no right to vote in the Ministerial or Heads of Government meetings, which is reserved for full members". The States of Guernsey and the Government of the Isle of Man have made calls of a similar nature for a more integrated relationship with the Commonwealth, including more direct representation and enhanced participation in Commonwealth organisations and meetings, including Commonwealth Heads of Government Meetings. The Chief Minister of the Isle of Man has said: "A closer connection with the Commonwealth itself would be a welcome further development of the Island's international relationships".

Suspension

Members can be suspended "from the Councils of the Commonwealth" for "serious or persistent violations" of the Harare Declaration, particularly in abrogating their responsibility to have democratic government. Suspensions are agreed by the Commonwealth Ministerial Action Group (CMAG), which meets regularly to address potential breaches of the Harare Declaration. Suspended members are not represented at meetings of Commonwealth leaders and ministers, although they remain members of the organisation.

Nigeria was suspended between 11 November 1995 and 29 May 1999, following its execution of Ken Saro-Wiwa on the eve of the 1995 CHOGM. Pakistan was the second country to be suspended, on 18 October 1999, following the military coup by Pervez Musharraf. The Commonwealth's longest suspension came to an end on 22 May 2004, when Pakistan's suspension was lifted following the restoration of the country's constitution. Pakistan was suspended for a second time, far more briefly, for six months from 22 November 2007, when Musharraf called a state of emergency. Zimbabwe was suspended in 2002 over concerns regarding the electoral and land reform policies of Robert Mugabe's ZANU-PF government, before it withdrew from the organisation in 2003. On 15 May 2018, Zimbabwe applied to rejoin the Commonwealth.

The declaration of a Republic in Fiji in 1987, after military coups designed to deny Indo-Fijians political power, was not accompanied by an application to remain. Commonwealth membership was held to have lapsed until 1997, after discriminatory provisions in the republican constitution were repealed and reapplication for membership made. Fiji has since been suspended twice, with the first imposed from 6 June 2000 to 20 December 2001 after another coup. Fiji was suspended yet again in December 2006, following the most recent coup. At first, the suspension applied only to membership on the Councils of the Commonwealth. After failing to meet a Commonwealth deadline for setting a date for national elections by 2010, Fiji was "fully suspended" on 1 September 2009. The secretary-general of the Commonwealth, Kamalesh Sharma, confirmed that full suspension meant that Fiji would be excluded from Commonwealth meetings, sporting events and the technical assistance programme (with an exception for assistance in re-establishing democracy). Sharma stated that Fiji would remain a member of the Commonwealth during its suspension, but would be excluded from emblematic representation by the secretariat. On 19 March 2014 Fiji's full suspension was amended to a suspension from councils of the Commonwealth by the Commonwealth Ministerial Action Group, permitting Fiji to join a number of Commonwealth activities, including the Commonwealth Games. Fiji's suspension was lifted in September 2014. The Commonwealth Ministerial Action Group fully reinstated Fiji as a member following elections in September 2014.

Most recently, during 2013 and 2014, international pressure mounted to suspend Sri Lanka from the Commonwealth, citing grave human rights violations by the government of President Mahinda Rajapaksa. There were also calls to change the Commonwealth Heads of Government Meeting 2013 from Sri Lanka to another member country. Canadian prime minister Stephen Harper threatened to boycott the event, but was instead represented at the meeting by Deepak Obhrai. UK Prime Minister David Cameron also chose to attend. These concerns were rendered moot by the election of opposition leader Maithripala Sirisena as president in 2015.

Withdrawal and termination

As membership is purely voluntary, member governments can choose at any time to leave the Commonwealth. The first state to do so was Ireland in 1948 following its decision to declare itself a republic. At the time, all members accepted the British monarch as head of state as a condition of membership. This rule was changed after Ireland's departure to allow India to retain membership when it became a republic, although Ireland did not rejoin. Pakistan left on 30 January 1972 in protest at the Commonwealth's recognition of breakaway Bangladesh, but rejoined on 2 August 1989. Zimbabwe's membership was suspended in 2002 on the grounds of alleged human rights violations and deliberate misgovernment, and Zimbabwe's government terminated its membership in 2003. The Gambia left the Commonwealth on 3 October 2013, and rejoined on 8 February 2018.

The Maldives withdrew from the Commonwealth on 13 October 2016, citing Commonwealth's "punitive actions against the Maldives since 2012" after the allegedly forced resignation of Maldivian President Mohamed Nasheed among the reasons for withdrawal. Following the election of Ibrahim Mohamed Solih as president in November 2018, the Maldives announced its intention to reapply to join the Commonwealth. They rejoined on 1 February 2020.

Although heads of government have the power to suspend member states from active participation, the Commonwealth has no provision for the expulsion of members.

Until 1948, there was a consensus among the existing half-dozen Commonwealth members that Commonwealth realms that became a republic would cease to be members but the situation changed in 1948 when newly independent India announced its intention to become a republic on 1 January 1950 although it wished to remain in the Commonwealth. This was granted. Now, the majority of the Commonwealth members, including all those from Africa, are republics or have their own native monarch.

Ireland withdrew from participation in the Commonwealth in the 1930s, attending its last Commonwealth governmental heads' meeting in 1932. For some years Ireland considered itself to be a republic outside the Commonwealth but the Commonwealth considered Ireland to still be a Commonwealth member. Its treatment as a member ended on 18 April 1949 when Irish legislation that the Commonwealth chose to regard as having caused Ireland to become a republic became law. It is the only country whose membership terminated without any declaration withdrawing from the organisation. Instead, it was (with its own tacit support) excluded from the organisation.

South Africa was barred from continuing as a member after it became a republic in 1961, due to hostility from many members, particularly those in Africa and Asia as well as Canada, to its policy of racial apartheid. The South African government withdrew its application to remain in the organisation as a republic when it became clear at the 1961 Commonwealth Prime Ministers' Conference that any such application would be rejected. South Africa was re-admitted to the Commonwealth in 1994, following its first multiracial elections that year.

The transfer of sovereignty over Hong Kong in 1997 ended the territory's status as a part of the Commonwealth through the United Kingdom. Non-sovereign states or regions are not permitted to become members of the Commonwealth. The government of the People's Republic of China has not pursued membership. Hong Kong has nevertheless continued to participate in some of the organisations of the Commonwealth Family, such as the Commonwealth Lawyers Association (hosted the Commonwealth Lawyers Conference in 1983 and 2009), the Commonwealth Parliamentary Association (and the Westminster Seminar on Parliamentary Practice and Procedures), the Association of Commonwealth Universities and the Commonwealth Association of Legislative Counsel, as well as the Commonwealth War Graves Commission (CWGC).

Politics

Objectives and activities
The Commonwealth's objectives were first outlined in the 1971 Singapore Declaration, which committed the Commonwealth to the institution of world peace; promotion of representative democracy and individual liberty; the pursuit of equality and opposition to racism; the fight against poverty, ignorance, and disease; and free trade. To these were added opposition to discrimination on the basis of gender by the Lusaka Declaration of 1979, and environmental sustainability by the Langkawi Declaration of 1989. These objectives were reinforced by the Harare Declaration in 1991.

The Commonwealth's current highest-priority aims are on the promotion of democracy and development, as outlined in the 2003 Aso Rock Declaration, which built on those in Singapore and Harare and clarified their terms of reference, stating, "We are committed to democracy, good governance, human rights, gender equality, and a more equitable sharing of the benefits of globalisation." The Commonwealth website lists its areas of work as: democracy, economics, education, gender, governance, human rights, law, small states, sport, sustainability, and youth.

Through a separate voluntary fund, Commonwealth governments support the Commonwealth Youth Programme, a division of the Secretariat with offices in Gulu (Uganda), Lusaka (Zambia), Chandigarh (India), Georgetown (Guyana) and Honiara (Solomon Islands).

Competence
In recent years, the Commonwealth has been accused of not being vocal enough on its core values. Allegations of a leaked memo from the Secretary General instructing staff not to speak out on human rights were published in October 2010.

The Commonwealth Heads of Government Meeting 2011 considered a report by a Commonwealth Eminent Persons Group (EPG) panel which asserted that the organisation had lost its relevance and was decaying due to the lack of a mechanism to censure member countries when they violated human rights or democratic norms. The panel made 106 "urgent" recommendations including the adoption of a Charter of the Commonwealth, the creation of a new commissioner on the rule of law, democracy and human rights to track persistent human rights abuses and allegations of political repression by Commonwealth member states, recommendations for the repeal of laws against homosexuality in 41 Commonwealth states and a ban on forced marriage. The failure to release the report, or accept its recommendations for reforms in the area of human rights, democracy and the rule of law, was decried as a "disgrace" by former British Foreign Secretary Sir Malcolm Rifkind, a member of the EPG, who told a press conference: "The Commonwealth faces a very significant problem. It's not a problem of hostility or antagonism, it's more of a problem of indifference. Its purpose is being questioned, its relevance is being questioned and part of that is because its commitment to enforce the values for which it stands is becoming ambiguous in the eyes of many member states. The Commonwealth is not a private club of the governments or the secretariat. It belongs to the people of the Commonwealth."

In the end, two-thirds of the EPG's 106 urgently recommended reforms were referred to study groups, an act described by one EPG member as having them "kicked into the long grass". There was no agreement to create the recommended position of human rights commissioner, instead a ministerial management group was empowered with enforcement: the group includes alleged human rights offenders. It was agreed to develop a charter of values for the Commonwealth without any decision on how compliance with its principles would be enforced.

The result of the effort was that a new Charter of the Commonwealth was signed by Queen Elizabeth on 11 March 2013 at Marlborough House, which opposes "all forms of discrimination, whether rooted in gender, race, colour, creed, political belief or other grounds".

Economy

Economic data by member

Postwar
During the Second World War, the British Empire played a major role in supporting British finances.  Foreign exchange reserves were pooled in London, to be used to fight the war.  In effect the United Kingdom procured £2.3 billion, of which £1.3 billion was from India.  The debt was held in the form of British government securities and became known as "sterling balances". By 1950, India, Pakistan and Ceylon had spent much of their sterling, while other countries accumulated more. The sterling area included all of the Commonwealth except for Canada, together with some smaller countries especially in the Persian Gulf.  They held their foreign-exchange in sterling, protecting that currency from runs and facilitating trade and investment inside the Commonwealth.  It was a formal relationship with fixed exchange rates, periodic meetings at Commonwealth summits to coordinate trade policy, and domestic economic policies. The United Kingdom ran a trade surplus, and the other countries were mostly producers of raw materials sold to the United Kingdom.  The commercial rationale was gradually less attractive to the Commonwealth; however, access to the growing London capital market remained an important advantage to the newly independent nations.  As the United Kingdom moved increasingly close to Europe, however, the long-term ties began to be in doubt.

UK joins the European Economic Community
By 1961, with a sluggish economy, the United Kingdom attempted to join the European Economic Community, but this was repeatedly vetoed by Charles de Gaulle. Entry was finally achieved in 1973. Queen Elizabeth was one of the few remaining links between the UK and the Commonwealth.  Historian Ben Pimlott argues that joining Europe "constituted the most decisive step yet in the progress of severance of familial ties between the United Kingdom and its former Empire... It reduced the remaining links to sentimental and cultural ones, and legal niceties."

The newly independent countries of Africa and Asia concentrated on their own internal political and economic development, and sometimes their role in the Cold War.  The United States, international agencies, and the Soviet Union became important players, and the British role receded. While there was opposition to British entry into the EEC from many countries, such as Australia, others preferred the economic advantages brought by British access to the Common Market. The historic ties between the former dominion nations and the United Kingdom were rapidly fraying. The Canadian economy increasingly focused on trade with the United States, and not on trade with the United Kingdom or other Commonwealth nations.  Internal Canadian disputes revolved around the growing American cultural and economic presence, and the strong force of Quebec nationalism. In 1964 the Maple Leaf flag replaced the Canadian Ensign, to the sorrow of many Anglophiles, with Gregory Johnson describing it as "the last gasp of empire". Australia and New Zealand were generally opposed to the United Kingdom's entry and exerted considerable influence on the eventual terms of accession in 1972, for which the United Kingdom agreed to transitional arrangements and monetary compensation to protect important export markets. Nevertheless, the implications of British entry into Europe seemed shattering to most Australians, particularly to older people and conservatives. Russell Ward summarises the period in economic terms: 
"In fact the United Kingdom, as Australia's chief trading partner, was being very rapidly replaced just at this time by the United States and an economically resurgent Japan, but most people were scarcely aware of this.... It was feared that British entry into the Common Market was bound to mean abolition, or at least scaling down, of preferential tariff arrangements for Australians goods."

Trade

Although the Commonwealth does not have a multilateral trade agreement, research by the Royal Commonwealth Society has shown that trade with another Commonwealth member is up to 50% more than with a non-member on average, with smaller and less wealthy states having a higher propensity to trade within the Commonwealth. At the 2005 Summit in Malta, the heads of government endorsed pursuing free trade among Commonwealth members on a bilateral basis.

Following its vote in June 2016 to leave the EU, some in the United Kingdom suggested the Commonwealth as an alternative to its membership in the European Union; however, it is far from clear that this would either offer sufficient economic benefit to replace the impact of leaving the EU or be acceptable to other member states. Although the EU is already in the process of negotiating free trade agreements with many Commonwealth countries such as India and Canada, it took the EU almost ten years to come to an agreement with Canada, due to the challenge associated with achieving the necessary EU-wide approvals.

On 17 December 2021, following the United Kingdom's exit from the European Union, Australia and the United Kingdom signed the Australia–United Kingdom Free Trade Agreement, which on ratification will eliminate tariffs and increase opportunities for movement between the two countries.

Commonwealth Family

Commonwealth countries share many links outside government, with over a hundred Commonwealth-wide non-governmental organisations, notably for sport, culture, education, law and charity. The Association of Commonwealth Universities is an important vehicle for academic links, particularly through scholarships, principally the Commonwealth Scholarship, for students to study in universities in other Commonwealth countries. There are also many non-official associations that bring together individuals who work within the spheres of law and government, such as the Commonwealth Lawyers Association and the Commonwealth Parliamentary Association.

Commonwealth Foundation

The Commonwealth Foundation is an intergovernmental organisation, resourced by and reporting to Commonwealth governments, and guided by Commonwealth values and priorities. Its mandate is to strengthen civil society in the achievement of Commonwealth priorities: democracy and good governance, respect for human rights and gender equality, poverty eradication, people-centred and sustainable development, and to promote arts and culture.

The Foundation was established in 1965 by the Heads of Government. Admittance is open to all members of the Commonwealth, and in December 2008, stood at 46 out of the 53 member countries. Associate Membership, which is open to associated states or overseas territories of member governments, has been granted to Gibraltar. 2005 saw celebrations for the Foundation's 40th Anniversary. The Foundation is headquartered in Marlborough House, Pall Mall, London. Regular liaison and co-operation between the Secretariat and the Foundation is in place. The Foundation continues to serve the broad purposes for which it was established as written in the Memorandum of Understanding.

Commonwealth Games

The Commonwealth Games, a multi-sport event, is held every four years; the 2018 Commonwealth Games were held in Gold Coast, Australia and 2022 Commonwealth Games in Birmingham; the 2026 Commonwealth Games are to be held across Victoria, Australia. As well as the usual athletic disciplines, as at the Summer Olympic Games, the games include sports particularly popular in the Commonwealth, such as bowls, netball, and rugby sevens. Started in 1930 as the Empire Games, the games were founded on the Olympic model of amateurism, but were deliberately designed to be "the Friendly Games", with the goal of promoting relations between Commonwealth countries and celebrating their shared sporting and cultural heritage.

The games are the Commonwealth's most visible activity and interest in the operation of the Commonwealth increases greatly when the Games are held. There is controversy over whether the games—and sport generally—should be involved in the Commonwealth's wider political concerns. The 1977 Gleneagles Agreement was signed to commit Commonwealth countries to combat apartheid through discouraging sporting contact with South Africa (which was not then a member), whilst the 1986 games were boycotted by most African, Asian, and Caribbean countries for the failure of other countries to enforce the Gleneagles Agreement.

Commonwealth War Graves Commission

The Commonwealth War Graves Commission (CWGC) is responsible for maintaining the war graves of 1.7 million service personnel who died in the First and Second World Wars fighting for Commonwealth member states. Founded in 1917 (as the Imperial War Graves Commission), the commission has constructed 2,500 war cemeteries, and maintains individual graves at another 20,000 sites around the world. The vast majority of the latter are civilian cemeteries in the United Kingdom. In 1998, the CWGC made the records of its buried online to facilitate easier searching.

Commonwealth war cemeteries often feature similar horticulture and architecture, with larger cemeteries being home to a Cross of Sacrifice and Stone of Remembrance. The CWGC is notable for marking the graves identically, regardless of the rank, country of origin, race, or religion of the buried.  It is funded by voluntary agreement by six Commonwealth members, in proportion to the nationality of the casualties in the graves maintained, with 75% of the funding coming from the United Kingdom.

Commonwealth of Learning

The Commonwealth of Learning (COL) is an intergovernmental organisation created by the Heads of Government to encourage the development and sharing of open learning/distance education knowledge, resources and technologies. COL is helping developing nations improve access to quality education and training.

Commonwealth Local Government Forum 

The Commonwealth Local Government Forum (CLGF) is a global local government organisation, bringing together local authorities, their national associations and the ministries responsible for local government in the member countries of the Commonwealth. CLGF works with national and local governments to support the development of democratic values and good local governance and is the associated organisation officially recognised by Commonwealth Heads of Government as the representative body for local government in the Commonwealth.

CLGF is unique in bringing together central, provincial and local spheres of government involved in local government policy and decision-making. CLGF members include local government associations, individual local authorities, ministries dealing with local government, and research and professional organisations who work with local government. Practitioner to practitioner support is at the core of CLGF's work across the Commonwealth and within the region, using CLGF's own members to support others both within and between regions. CLGF is a member of the Global Taskforce of Local and Regional Governments, the formal partner of the UN Major Group of Local Authorities.

Culture
Many Commonwealth nations possess traditions and customs that are elements of a shared Commonwealth culture. Examples include common sports such as cricket and rugby, driving on the left, the Westminster system of parliamentary democracy, common law, widespread use of the English language, designation of English as an official language, military and naval ranks, and the use of British rather than American spelling conventions (see English in the Commonwealth of Nations).

Sport
Many Commonwealth nations play similar sports that are considered quintessentially British in character, rooted in and developed under British rule or hegemony, including cricket, football, rugby, field hockey and netball. These ties are particularly strong between the United Kingdom, Australia, New Zealand and South Africa across rugby union, cricket, netball, and field hockey, with Australia in rugby league, with the Caribbean nations in cricket and netball, and with the Indian subcontinent in cricket and hockey. Canada, by contrast, is dominated by North American sports, including baseball instead of cricket, basketball rather than netball, ice hockey rather than field hockey and Canadian football, rather than rugby union or league. Canada does, however, maintain small enthusiastic communities in all the more traditional Commonwealth sports, having reached the World Cup in each of them, and is the homeplace of the Commonwealth Games, hosting the inaugural edition in Hamilton in 1930. 

This shared sporting landscape has led to the development of friendly national rivalries between the main sporting nations that have often defined their relations with each other, and in the cases of India, Australia and New Zealand, have played a major part in defining their emerging national character (in cricket, cricket and rugby league, and rugby union respectively). Indeed, said rivalries preserved close ties by providing a constant in international relationships, even as the Empire transformed into the Commonwealth. Externally, playing these sports is seen to be a sign of sharing a certain Commonwealth culture; the adoption of cricket at schools in Rwanda is seen as symbolic of the country's move towards Commonwealth membership.

The Commonwealth Games, a quadrennial multi-sports event held in the middle year of an Olympic cycle is the most visible demonstration of these sporting ties. The Games include standard multi-sports disciplines like athletics, swimming, gymnastics, and cycling, but also includes sports popular in the Commonwealth that are distinct to the Games such as netball, squash and lawn bowls. They are also more avowedly political than events like the Olympics, promoting what are seen as Commonwealth values; historically, a history of shared military endeavor was celebrated and promoted, parasport and disability sport is fully integrated, and the Commonwealth Games Federation has publicly backed the rights of LGBT people, despite the continuing criminalisation of homosexuality in many Commonwealth countries.

The most recent edition of the games was held in 2022 in Birmingham, England. The 2026 Commonwealth Games will be held in the state of Victoria, Australia.

Literature

The shared history of British presence has produced a substantial body of writing in many languages, known as Commonwealth literature. The Association for Commonwealth Literature and Language Studies has 11 branches worldwide and holds an international conference every three years.

In 1987, the Commonwealth Foundation established the annual Commonwealth Writers' Prize "to encourage and reward the upsurge of new Commonwealth fiction and ensure that works of merit reach a wider audience outside their country of origin". Prizes are awarded for the best book and best first book in the Commonwealth; there are also regional prizes for the best book and best first book in each of four regions. Although not officially affiliated with the Commonwealth, the prestigious annual Man Booker Prize, one of the highest honours in literature, used to be awarded only to authors from Commonwealth countries or former members such as Ireland and Zimbabwe. Since 2014, however, writers of any nationality have been eligible for the prize providing that they write originally in English and their novels are published by established publishers in the United Kingdom.

There had been a few important works in English prior to 1950 from the then British Empire. From 1950 on, a significant number of writers from the countries of the Commonwealth began gaining international recognition, including some who migrated to the United Kingdom.

The South African writer Olive Schreiner's famous novel The Story of an African Farm was published in 1883 and New Zealander Katherine Mansfield published her first collection of short stories, In a German Pension, in 1911. The first major novelist, writing in English, from the Indian sub-continent, R. K. Narayan, began publishing in England in the 1930s, thanks to the encouragement of English novelist Graham Greene. Caribbean writer Jean Rhys's writing career began as early as 1928, though her most famous work, Wide Sargasso Sea, was not published until 1966. South Africa's Alan Paton's famous Cry, the Beloved Country dates from 1948. Doris Lessing from Southern Rhodesia, now Zimbabwe, was a dominant presence in the English literary scene, frequently publishing from 1950 on throughout the 20th century. She won the Nobel Prize in Literature in 2007.

Salman Rushdie is another post-Second World War writer from the former British colonies who permanently settled in the United Kingdom. Rushdie achieved fame with Midnight's Children (1981). His most controversial novel, The Satanic Verses (1989), was inspired in part by the life of Muhammad. V. S. Naipaul (born 1932), born in Trinidad, was another immigrant, who wrote among other things A Bend in the River (1979). Naipaul won the Nobel Prize in Literature in 2001.

Many other Commonwealth writers have achieved an international reputation for works in English, including Nigerian novelist Chinua Achebe, and playwright Wole Soyinka. Soyinka won the Nobel Prize in Literature in 1986, as did South African novelist Nadine Gordimer in 1995. Other South African writers in English are novelist J. M. Coetzee (Nobel Prize 2003) and playwright Athol Fugard. Kenya's most internationally renowned author is Ngũgĩ wa Thiong'o, who has written novels, plays and short stories in English. Poet Derek Walcott, from Saint Lucia in the Caribbean, was another Nobel Prize winner in 1992. An Australian, Patrick White, a major novelist in this period, whose first work was published in 1939, won in 1973. Other noteworthy Australian writers at the end of this period are poet Les Murray, and novelist Peter Carey, who is one of only four writers to have won the Booker Prize twice.

Political system

Due to their shared constitutional histories, most countries in the Commonwealth have similar legal and political systems. The Commonwealth requires its members to be functioning democracies that respect human rights and the rule of law. Most Commonwealth countries have the bicameral Westminster system of parliamentary democracy. The Commonwealth Parliamentary Association facilitates co-operation between legislatures across the Commonwealth, and the Commonwealth Local Government Forum promotes good governance amongst local government officials. Most Commonwealth members use common law, modelled on English law. The Latimer House Principles adopted in 2003 are aware of the separation of powers. The Judicial Committee of the Privy Council is the supreme court of 14 Commonwealth members.

Symbols
The Commonwealth has adopted a number of symbols that represent the association of its members. The English language is recognised as a symbol of the members' heritage; as well as being considered a symbol of the Commonwealth, recognition of it as "the means of Commonwealth communication" is a prerequisite for Commonwealth membership. The flag of the Commonwealth consists of the symbol of the Commonwealth Secretariat, a gold globe surrounded by emanating rays, on a dark blue field; it was designed for the second CHOGM in 1973, and officially adopted on 26 March 1976. 1976 also saw the organisation agree to a common date on which to commemorate Commonwealth Day, the second Monday in March, having developed separately on different dates from Empire Day celebrations.

Recognition
In 2009, to mark the 60th anniversary of the founding of the Commonwealth, the Royal Commonwealth Society commissioned a poll of public opinion in seven of the member states: Australia, Canada, India, Jamaica, Malaysia, South Africa and the United Kingdom.  It found that most people in these countries were largely ignorant of the Commonwealth's activities, aside from the Commonwealth Games, and indifferent toward its future.  Support for the Commonwealth was twice as high in developing countries as in developed countries; it was lowest in the United Kingdom.

Commonwealth Anthem
Also to mark the 60th anniversary (Diamond Jubilee) of the Commonwealth in 2009, the Commonwealth Secretariat commissioned Paul Carroll to compose "The Commonwealth Anthem". The lyrics of the Anthem are taken from the 1948 Universal Declaration of Human Rights. The Commonwealth has published the Anthem, performed by the Commonwealth Youth Orchestra, with and without an introductory narrative.

See also

 Anglosphere
 Community of Portuguese Language Countries, an equivalent grouping of Portuguese-speaking countries and territories
 English-speaking world
 La Francophonie
 List of country groupings
 List of multilateral free-trade agreements
 List of Commonwealth of Nations countries by GDP
 List of Commonwealth of Nations prime ministers
 Organization of Ibero-American States
 Representatives of the Commonwealth of Nations
 Special Relationship, the common name for the relations between the United Kingdom and the United States

Notes

References

Further reading 

 Ashton, Sarah R. "British government perspectives on the Commonwealth, 1964–71: An asset or a liability?". Journal of Imperial and Commonwealth History 35.1 (2007): 73–94.
 Bloomfield, Valerie. Commonwealth Elections 1945–1970 (1976).
 Cook, Chris and John Paxton. Commonwealth Political Facts (Macmillan, 1978).
 Hall, H. Duncan. "The genesis of the Balfour declaration of 1926". Journal of Commonwealth & Comparative Politics 1.3 (1962): 169–193.
 Holland, Robert F. Britain and the Commonwealth Alliance, 1918-39 (Springer, 1981).
 
 Lloyd, Lorna. Diplomacy with a difference: the Commonwealth Office of High Commissioner, 1880–2006 (Brill, 2007).
 McIntyre, W. David. "The strange death of dominion status". Journal of Imperial and Commonwealth History 27.2 (1999): 193–212.
 McIntyre, W. David. The commonwealth of nations: Origins and impact, 1869–1971 (University of Minnesota Press, 1977); Comprehensive coverage giving London's perspective on political and constitutional relations with each possession.
 McIntyre, W. David. A Guide to the Contemporary Commonwealth, Palgrave, 2001. .
 McIntyre, W. David. "The Unofficial Commonwealth Relations Conferences, 1933–59: Precursors of the Tri-sector Commonwealth." Journal of Imperial and Commonwealth History 36.4 (2008): 591–614.
 Madden, Frederick and John Darwin, eds. The Dependent Empire, 1900–1948: Colonies, Protectorates, and the Mandates (1994), 908 pp. online
 Maitland, Donald. ed. Britain, the Commonwealth and Europe (Palgrave Macmillan UK, 2001) online 
 Mansergh, Nicholas The Commonwealth in the World, University of Toronto Press, 1982. .
 Moore, R.J. Making the New Commonwealth, Clarendon Press, 1988. .
 Murphy, Philip. Monarchy and the End of Empire: The House of Windsor, the British Government, and the Postwar Commonwealth (Oxford UP 2013) 
 Perkin, Harold. "Teaching the nations how to play: sport and society in the British empire and Commonwealth". International Journal of the History of Sport 6.2 (1989): 145–155.
 Shaw, Timothy M. Commonwealth: Inter- and Non-State Contributions to Global Governance, Routledge, 2008. 
 Srinivasan, Krishnan. The rise, decline and future of the British Commonwealth (Springer, 2005).
 Wheare, K. C. The Constitutional Structure of the Commonwealth, Clarendon Press, 1960. .
 Williams, Paul D. "Blair's Britain and the Commonwealth". The Round Table 94.380 (2005): 381–391.
 Winks, Robin, ed. The Historiography of the British Empire-Commonwealth: Trends, Interpretations and Resources (1966) online

Primary sources

 Madden, Frederick, ed. The End of Empire: Dependencies since 1948: Select Documents on the Constitutional History of the British Empire and Commonwealth: The West Indies, British Honduras, Hong Kong, Fiji, Cyprus, Gibraltar, and the Falklands (2000)  online 596pp
 Madden, Frederick, and John Darwin, ed. The Dependent Empire: 1900–1948: Colonies, Protectorates, and Mandates (1963), 908pp online
 Mansergh, Nicholas, ed. Documents and Speeches on Commonwealth Affairs, 1952–1962 (1963), 804pp online

External links

 Commonwealth Secretariat
 The Commonwealth of Nations Network
 Commonwealth Foundation
 The Royal Commonwealth Society
 The Commonwealth Countries League

 
English-speaking countries and territories
Intergovernmental organizations
International organisations based in London
Organizations established in 1949
Political history of Australia
Political history of Canada
Political history of the United Kingdom